Michael Tererui (born April 7, 1963) is a former weightlifter who competed for the Cook Islands

Tererui competed at the 1988 Summer Olympics in Seoul, he entered the heavyweight division in the weightlifting, where he finished 16th out of 21 starters. He later became an official weightlifting coach.

References

External links
 

1963 births
Living people
Cook Island male weightlifters
Weightlifters at the 1988 Summer Olympics
Olympic weightlifters of the Cook Islands